Christopher John Doleman (October 16, 1961 – January 28, 2020) was an American professional football player who was a defensive end in the National Football League (NFL). He spent the majority of his career with the Minnesota Vikings, and also played for the Atlanta Falcons and San Francisco 49ers. Doleman was an eight-time Pro Bowl selection and a three-time first-team All-Pro, recording 150.5 career sacks. He is a member of the Pro Football Hall of Fame class of 2012.

Early life
Doleman attended William Penn Senior High School in York, Pennsylvania, and graduated in 1980. He spent a postgraduate year at Valley Forge Military Academy in 1981.

College career
Doleman played football collegiately at the University of Pittsburgh. He was a star linebacker and defensive end for the Pitt Panthers from 1981 to 1984. He ended his career at Pitt with 25 sacks which was good for third all-time at the time of his departure. That total still ranks sixth in the Pitt annals.

Professional career
Doleman was selected by the Minnesota Vikings in the first round (4th overall) of the 1985 NFL Draft. He began his NFL career as an outside linebacker (OLB) in the Vikings' 3–4 defense, but for the 1987 season (Doleman's third season) the team decided to switch to a 4–3 defense, which resulted in him being moved from his spot at OLB up to the defensive line to play as a defensive end. The move paid off for Doleman, who recorded 21 sacks in the 1989 season, the highest total recorded that season and the fourth-highest total ever. The 21 sacks in a single season was a Vikings record until Jared Allen recorded 22 sacks in 2011. Doleman later played for the Atlanta Falcons and the San Francisco 49ers before returning to the Vikings in 1999 for his final season.

He was a first-team All-Pro in 1987, 1989 and 1992. He garnered second-team All-Pro selections in 1990 and 1993.

In 2012, Doleman was elected to the Pro Football Hall of Fame.

NFL career statistics

Personal life
On January 25, 2018, Doleman had brain surgery for a condition which was later diagnosed as glioblastoma. On January 28, 2020, Doleman died from the disease at the age of 58. He was honored prior to kickoff at Super Bowl LIV five days later.

References

External links

1961 births
2020 deaths
American football defensive ends
American football linebackers
African-American players of American football
Atlanta Falcons players
Minnesota Vikings players
Pittsburgh Panthers football players
San Francisco 49ers players
National Conference Pro Bowl players
Pro Football Hall of Fame inductees
Players of American football from Indianapolis
Sportspeople from York, Pennsylvania
Players of American football from Pennsylvania
Deaths from brain cancer in the United States
Deaths from glioblastoma
20th-century African-American sportspeople
21st-century African-American people
100 Sacks Club